The Dutch Eerste Divisie in the 2002–03 season was contested by 18 teams. ADO Den Haag won the championship.

Promoted Teams
These teams were promoted to the Eredivisie
 ADO Den Haag — Eerste Divisie champions
 FC Volendam — playoff winners

New entrants
Relegated from the 2001–02 Eredivisie
 FC Den Bosch
 Fortuna Sittard
 Sparta Rotterdam

League standings

Playoff standings

See also
 2002–03 Eredivisie
 2002–03 KNVB Cup
 2002–03 Sparta Rotterdam season

References
Netherlands - List of final tables (RSSSF)

Eerste Divisie seasons
2002–03 in Dutch football
Neth